is a Japanese shōjo manga series by Yue Takasuka that ran in the monthly magazine Ribon from 1997 to 2002. Part of the story has been adapted into an OVA. In 2007, a sequel manga, was serialized in Cookie. As of December 2019, eighteen volumes have been released.

A live-action television adaptation was co-produced by Fuji TV (Japan) & Netflix (worldwide). Like the manga, the series is set in Tokyo and follows the relationships of the main characters from high school to university. Season one streamed on Fuji on Demand and Netflix Japan from February 12, 2016 to June 10, 2016. A second season aired on September 22, 2017 under the title Good Morning Call: Our Campus Days. According to the program's social media, a third season is under discussion.

Plot
Teenager Nao Yoshikawa has moved into her own 2DK apartment in the city as her parents have returned to the country to manage the family farm. However, she soon discovers that Hisashi Uehara, a good-looking classmate, is also moving in. Realizing that they have been scammed into renting the same apartment, they agree to become roommates in order to make the rental payment. The story follows their adventures as they try to keep their cohabitation a secret from their classmates, with Nao developing romantic feelings for Hisashi as she gets to know him better.

Characters

; Played by: Haruka Fukuhara
Nao is a teenage girl who tends to be a little air-headed and easygoing. Because of a scam in her rental agreement, she and Hisashi Uehara end up sharing an apartment until other options open up. Nao is more often annoyed by Hisashi than attracted by his looks like her classmates. However, she begins to care about getting along with him and grows to like him more than just as a roommate. She starts to date Hisashi later in the story. In the end of the manga, Nao and Uehara move into different apartments, due to the landlady of their previous apartment having a son who wanted to rent out a room for him and his girlfriend.

; Played by: Shunya Shiraishi
Hisashi is a good-looking boy, and unsurprisingly has a bunch of fan-girls. He had a big crush on Yuri for 6 years (8 years in the live-action drama), but was heartbroken when she had married his older brother despite her knowing about his crush on her. Later in the story, Hisashi and Nao live next door in the apartment.

; Played by: Moe Arai
Marina is Nao's best friend who keeps a book of all the hot boys she knows. Although Marina is very knowledgeable about them, she would never go out with anyone she doesn't like. Later in the story, she starts going out with Yuichi Mitsuishi.

 Yuichi Mitsuishi
Played by: Shugo Nagashima
One of Nao's other best friend who is the son of a doctor. He starts dating Marina later on in the series.

Yuri Uehara
; Played by: Erika Mori
Yuri is Hisashi's sister-in-law who enjoys shopping.

; Played by: Koya Nagasawa
Jun is Nao's classmate, who is called the "King of Confessions" because he often goes around asking girls out, but gets rejected every single time.

Nanako Kusanagi
Played by: Hinako Tanaka
Nanako is the twelve-year-old daughter of the owner of the shop that Hisashi works at. Being a spoiled brat, she wants Hisashi to be her boyfriend and loves to make fun of Nao. In the final chapter, she realizes that her feelings for Hisashi were nothing more than admiration and not true love.

 Issei Sata
Played by: Kentaro Ito
Issei is the son of the owner of a ramen shop.

Ota
Ota is Nao's friend in university. She is single, and often daydreams about what being in a relationship would be like.

 Daichi Shinozaki
 Played by: Dori Sakurada
 A drama original character, Daichi is Nao's childhood friend. He is usually helping out his classmates on various activities. Daichi acts kind and caring, but also protective when it comes to Nao.

 Takuya Uehara
 Played by: Kei Tanaka
 Hisashi's handsome and successful brother and Yuri's husband.

Media

Manga
Good Morning Call is written and illustrated by Yue Takasuka. It was serialized in the monthly magazine Ribon from September 1997 to April 2002. The chapters were later released in 11 bound volumes by Shueisha under the Ribon Mascot Comics imprint.

A sequel to the series, titled Good Morning Kiss, is running in Cookie.

Good Morning Call

Good Morning Kiss
  published on May 15, 2007

OVA
An original video animation adaptation of Good Morning Call was screened as a short film at the 2001 Ribon Festival on August 2, 2001 as a double-feature with Time Strange Kyoko: Leave it to Chocola!

Television drama
A live-action television drama adaptation was released weekly on Fuji on Demand and Netflix Japan starting February 12, 2016. The series stars Haruka Fukuhara as Nao Yoshikawa and Shunya Shiraishi as Hisashi Uehara. It ran for 17 episodes until June 10, 2016. It was later streamed internationally on Netflix starting May 13. It was broadcast on Fuji TV from October 12, 2016 to January 11, 2017.

A second season with 10 episodes, titled Good Morning Call: Our Campus Days was released on Fuji on Demand and Netflix Japan on September 22, 2017. The season follows Nao and Hisashi as college students. It was released internationally on Netflix on November 28, 2017.

According to the program's social media, a third season is under discussion.

Series overview

Season 1 (2016)

Season 2: Our Campus Days (2017)

References

External links
 
 
 

1997 manga
2001 anime OVAs
2007 manga
Romance anime and manga
Shōjo manga
Shueisha franchises